The 2000 GP Miguel Induráin was the 47th edition of the GP Miguel Induráin cycle race and was held on 1 April 2000. The race started and finished in Estella. The race was won by Miguel Ángel Perdiguero.

General classification

References

2000
2000 in Spanish road cycling